Gaddi (also called Gaddki, Gaddiyali or Bharmauri;) is an Indo-Aryan language of India. It is spoken by the Gaddi people primarily in Bharmour Tehsil of Chamba district in Himachal Pradesh. It is also spoken in neighbouring parts of Jammu, with Gaddi villages found in Udhampur, Kathua and Doda districts.The language has traditionally been written using the Takri script.

Dialects 
There are four dialects of the language:
The first one is spoken in the entire Bharmaur, Chhatrari and Bhatyat Tehsils of Chamba and Gaddi speaking regions of Kangra district.
The second one is spoken in consists of Piyuhar, Belaj, Guun, Bakani, the upper part of Mehla and Kaded, etc. 
The third one is spoken in the region of Basu and other adjoining area. 
The fourth on is spoken in Lilh and Paho.

Status 
The language is commonly called Pahari or Himachali. Some speaker may even call it a dialect of Dogri. The language has no official status. According to the United Nations Education, Scientific and Cultural Organisation (UNESCO), the language is of definitely endangered category, i.e. many Gaddi children are not learning Gaddi as their mother tongue any longer.

The demand for the inclusion of 'Pahari (Himachali)' under the Eight Schedule of the Constitution, which is supposed to represent multiple Pahari languages of Himachal Pradesh, had been made in the year 2010 by the state's Vidhan Sabha. There has been no positive progress on this matter since then even when small organisations are striving to save the language.

References

External links 
 Gaddi grammar sketches

Northern Indo-Aryan languages
Languages of Himachal Pradesh
Languages of Jammu and Kashmir